NRK Sport is a brand name for sports programming produced by the sports department of Norwegian Broadcasting Corporation (NRK). The brand name is used on most national sports broadcasts on television, radio and new media. NRK Sport is produced both in Norway and other countries.

Radio station 
NRK Sport is also a radio station, which only broadcasts sports programming via DAB and the Internet in Norwegian.

References

External links 
 NRK Sport website 
 NRK Sport Internet radio

NRK
Norwegian brands
Radio stations in Norway